Harold McCormick may refer to:
Harold Fowler McCormick (1872–1941), American businessman and tennis player
Harold C. McCormick (1910–2000), American politician from Iowa